William Thomas Medley (born September 19, 1940) is an American singer and songwriter, best known as one half of The Righteous Brothers.  He is noted for his bass-baritone voice, exemplified in songs such as "You've Lost That Lovin' Feelin'".  Medley produced a number of the duo's songs, including "Unchained Melody" and "(You're My) Soul and Inspiration".

Medley is a successful solo artist, and his million-selling #1 duet with Jennifer Warnes "(I've Had) The Time of My Life" won a number of awards.

Early life
Medley was born September 19, 1940 in Santa Ana, California to Arnol and Irma Medley. He attended Santa Ana High School, graduating in 1958. Raised a Presbyterian, he sang in the church choir, and his parents had a swing band. He became interested in R&B music through listening to black-oriented radio stations. An early influence he has cited is Little Richard, who he first heard when he was fifteen or sixteen years old, and later Ray Charles, Bobby "Blue" Bland, and B.B. King.

Medley first formed a singing duo called The Romancers with his friend Don Fiduccia, who also played the guitar. He began to write songs and record multi-track recordings in his living room. At 19, he had two songs, "Womaling" and "Chimes of My Heart," recorded by vocal group The Diamonds. Medley and Fiduccia then formed a group called The Paramours in 1960, with Sal Fasulo and Nick Tuturro, later joined by Mike Rider and Barry Rillera. The band had its first paying gig at Little Italy restaurant in Anaheim, California. The Paramours were signed to Mercury Records' subsidiary label Smash Records, releasing such songs as "That's the Way We Love" and "Miss Social Climber" in 1961.

The Righteous Brothers

Medley first met his singing partner Bobby Hatfield through Barry Rillera who was in both Hatfield's and Medley's band (The Variations and the aforementioned Paramours, respectively) and asked them to see each other's shows. In 1962 they formed a new group, but kept the name The Paramours, which included saxophonist John Wimber, who went on to found The Vineyard Church movement. They performed at The Black Derby nightclub in Santa Ana, and released the single "There She Goes (She's Walking Away)" in December 1962 through independent record label Moonglow. However, the band did not have much success and soon broke up, leaving Hatfield and Medley to perform as a duo in 1963. 

Medley and Hatfield adopted the name The Righteous Brothers, and their first single was the Medley-penned "Little Latin Lupe Lu," released through Moonglow Records. Medley also recorded as a solo artist with Moonglow, releasing the single "Gotta Tell You How I Feel," which did not chart.

In 1964, The Righteous Brothers appeared in a show with other groups at The Cow Palace in San Francisco, where Phil Spector was conducting the band for the entire show. Spector was impressed by the duo, and arranged to have them record for his label Philles Records. 

In 1965 they had their first No. 1 hit, You've Lost That Lovin' Feelin', produced by Spector. According to music-publishing watchdog Broadcast Music, Inc., "You've Lost That Lovin' Feelin'" is the most-played song in the history of American radio. 

They recorded other songs such as "Unchained Melody" with Philles Records, as well. Medley, who had produced the duo before they signed with Spector and Philles, was the actual producer on many tracks and B-sides credited to Spector, including "Unchained Melody," which was originally only intended to be an album track. On singles such as "You've Lost That Lovin' Feelin'" and "Just Once in My Life," the vocals were concentrated mainly on Medley, but on a few singles, such as "Unchained Melody" and "Ebb Tide," Hatfield performed solo.

The duo left Spector in 1966 to sign with Verve Records, where they had a hit with "Soul and Inspiration", but broke up in 1968 when Medley left to pursue his own career. Medley was performing three shows a night in Las Vegas; according to Medley, he found it too much of a strain on his voice singing solo, and lost his voice for a while. Under advice, he sought out Hatfield to reform The Righteous Brothers in 1974. 

They signed with Haven Records, and quickly recorded "Rock and Roll Heaven," which became a hit. In 1976, Medley decided to quit music for some time after the death of his first wife. He reunited with Hatfield in 1981 for the 30th-anniversary special of American Bandstand, where they performed an updated version of "Rock and Roll Heaven." Although Medley focused his attention on his solo career in the 1980s, they continued to appear together as a duo. 

After a resurgence in popularity in 1990s due to the use of "Unchained Melody" in the film Ghost, they toured extensively as a duo until Hatfield's death in November 2003. The Righteous Brothers were inducted into the Rock and Roll Hall of Fame in March 2003 by Billy Joel.

Solo career

Medley also had a moderately successful solo career. In 1968, Medley first recorded "I Can't Make It Alone" written by Carole King, but the song failed to make much of an impact. The following singles, "Brown Eyed Woman" written by Mann and Weil, and "Peace, Brother, Peace" both performed better, and were Top 40 pop hits. In 1969 he won 2nd place at the Festival Internacional da Canção (FIC) in Rio de Janeiro with the song "Evie" by Jimmy Webb. Medley performed "Hey Jude" at the 1969 Grammy Awards, and was then signed to A&M Records, which released a number of his records. One of his recordings, "Freedom and Fear" from Michel Colombier's album Wings, was nominated for a Grammy in 1972.

Medley released several solo albums during the 1970s and 1980s, and enjoyed a resurgence in his career in the 1980s. He released the album Sweet Thunder in 1980, containing a version of "Don't Know Much," which was originally written and performed by Barry Mann the same year. He signed with Planet Records in 1982 and later with RCA Records. In 1984 and 1985 he charted five singles on the country charts, the biggest of these being the Top 20 country hit "I Still Do," which also crossed over to the Adult Contemporary chart, and later became a cult hit with the Carolina Beach/Shag dance-club circuit. One of Medley's minor entries, "All I Need to Know," was later recorded as "Don't Know Much" by Grammy-winning duet Linda Ronstadt and Aaron Neville; this was a long-running No. 2 Hot 100 and No. 1 Adult Contemporary hit in 1989-90.

In 1987 his duet with Jennifer Warnes, "(I've Had) The Time of My Life," was included on the Dirty Dancing soundtrack, and the single reached number one on the Billboard Hot 100. The song won Medley and Warnes a 1988 Grammy Award for Best Pop Performance by a Duo or Group with Vocal and an Academy Award for Best Original Song for the composers. "(I've Had) The Time of My Life" is now seen and heard ubiquitously on TV and radio commercials—covered by singers other than Medley and Warnes—usually connected with vacation, cruise, resort, and other such holiday-themed advertisers.

Among his other notable songs are "Most of All You," the closing theme to the movie Major League; "Friday Night's a Great Night for Football" from Tony Scott's movie The Last Boy Scout; and the theme song for the Growing Pains spinoff Just the Ten of Us. He also collaborated with Giorgio Moroder and scored a moderate UK hit in 1988 with a version of "He Ain't Heavy, He's My Brother." Medley lensed a video for the song which was also used over the closing credits for the film Rambo III. Medley continues to perform solo after Bobby Hatfield's death in 2003.

Recent work
Bill Medley appeared in the two-part episode "Finally!" of the hit television show, Cheers. In 1998 Medley, along with Jennifer Warnes, sang "Show Me the Light" over the closing credits of Rudolph the Red-Nosed Reindeer: The Movie. He also recorded a vocal track for the song Lullabye on Jimmy Chamberlin's (of Smashing Pumpkins fame) solo album, Life Begins Again.

Through the mid to late 2000s, Medley performed mainly in Branson, Missouri, at Dick Clark's American Bandstand Theater, Andy Williams' Moon River Theater, and The Starlite Theatre. Later Medley also began touring with his daughter McKenna and her 3-Bottle Band.  On November 24, 2013, he performed in concert for the first time in the UK at Wembley Arena.

Bill Medley wrote a memoir which was published in April 2014, titled The Time of My Life: A Righteous Brother's Memoir.

In January 2016, Medley announced he would revive the Righteous Brothers for the first time since 2003, partnering with new singer Bucky Heard.

Personal life
Bill Medley met his first wife Karen O'Grady in church, started dating in 1963, and they were married at the beginning of his music career. Their son Darrin was born in 1965, but they were divorced when Darrin was about five. Medley married Suzi Robertson in 1970, then Janice Gorham, but each marriage was soon annulled.  He had a number of relationships with other women, including Darlene Love, Mary Wilson, and Connie Stevens. Medley was also a close friend of Elvis Presley.

In January 1976, his first wife Karen, by then remarried and named Karen Klaas, was raped and murdered by a stranger, and Medley decided to take time off from his music career to look after his 10-year-old son Darrin. The murder had not been solved and Medley employed a private investigator in an effort to track down the killer. On January 27, 2017, the Los Angeles County Sheriff's Department announced that investigators used a controversial DNA testing method to solve the decades-old murder. The sheriff's department said that the case "was solved through the use of familial DNA, which identified the killer," who was named as Kenneth Troyer, a sex offender and fugitive killed by police in 1982.

Medley married his current wife Paula in 1986, and they have a daughter, McKenna.  Their daughter is also a singer, and performs with Medley as his duetting partner on "Time of My Life" in his tour.

Awards and nominations

Medley was nominated for Best Arrangement Accompanying Vocalist in the 1972 Grammy Awards for his recording of "Freedom and Fear", a track from Michel Colombier's album Wings.

In 1988, Medley received a Grammy Award for Best Pop Performance by a Duo or Group with Vocals for his duet with Jennifer Warnes on "(I've Had) The Time of My Life".

Discography

Albums

Singles

References

External links
Interview with Bill Medley for WGBH's series "Rock and Roll: In The Groove"
Righteous Brothers Discography, contains Bill Medley Discographies
Bill Medley bio on The Righteous Brothers website
Bill Medley serves on the Board of Directors of the OC Pavilion
Interview with Bill Medley
Dick Clark's American Bandstand - Branson Homepage

1940 births
Living people
20th-century American singers
21st-century American singers
American country singer-songwriters
American male singer-songwriters
American soul singers
American bass-baritones
Grammy Award winners
Singers from Los Angeles
People from Santa Ana, California
Country musicians from California
20th-century American male singers
21st-century American male singers
Singer-songwriters from California
The Righteous Brothers members